Tauno Johannes Luiro (24 February 1932 – 29 October 1955) was a Finnish ski jumper.

Career
In February 1951 he became the first non-Norwegian to win the youth ski jumping competition in Holmenkollen, Oslo.

On 2 March 1951 he set a new world record at 139 metres (456 ft) on Heini-Klopfer-Skiflugschanze in Oberstdorf, West Germany, which remained unbeaten until 1961.

He competed in the individual large hill event at the 1952 Winter Olympics and tied for 18th place.

Luiro suffered from diabetes, and died of lung tuberculosis in 1955, aged 23. His younger brother Erkki Luiro was an Olympic Nordic combined competitor, while his nephew Tauno Käyhkö became an Olympic ski jumper.

Ski jumping world record

References

External links

1924–56 Winter Olympic ski jumping results

1932 births
1955 deaths
People from Rovaniemi
Olympic ski jumpers of Finland
Ski jumpers at the 1952 Winter Olympics
Finnish male ski jumpers
20th-century deaths from tuberculosis
Tuberculosis deaths in Finland
Sportspeople from Lapland (Finland)
20th-century Finnish people